The Bureau of International Narcotics and Law Enforcement Affairs (INL) is an agency that reports to the Under Secretary for Civilian Security, Democracy, and Human Rights within the Department of State.  Under the umbrella of its general mission of developing policies and programs to combat international narcotics and crime, INL plays an important role in the training of partner nation security forces.

INL works to keep Americans safe by countering crime, illegal drugs, and instability abroad.  The bureau's programs have 4 main objectives; 1) disrupt and reduce illicit drug markets and transnational crime, 2) combat corruption and illicit financing to strengthen democratic institutions and advance rule of law, 3) strengthen criminal justice systems to support stable, rights respecting partners, and 4) leverage learning, data, and resources to advance the mission. Counternarcotics and anticrime programs also complement counterterrorism efforts, both directly and indirectly, by promoting modernization of and supporting operations by foreign criminal justice systems and law enforcement agencies charged with the counter-terrorism mission.  The head of the Bureau is the Assistant Secretary of State for International Narcotics and Law Enforcement Affairs, Todd D. Robinson. 

The bureau manages the Department of State's Narcotics Rewards Program and Transnational Organized Crime Rewards Program in close coordination with the Department of Justice, Department of Homeland Security, Immigration and Customs Enforcement (ICE), the Drug Enforcement Administration (DEA), Federal Bureau of Investigation (FBI), and other interested U.S. agencies.

INL is not a law enforcement organization but it specializes in managing large law enforcement training programs, e.g. in Afghanistan, Colombia, and Iraq.

The Bureau of International Narcotics and Law Enforcement Affairs, Office of Aviation (INL/A), is the aviation service 
provider in support of counter-narcotics, law enforcement, and overseas missions operations. The Bureau has more than 200 fixed wing and rotary wing aircraf (including OV-10, AT-802 and C-27 planes and Hueys, Blackhawk and K-Max helicopters) involved in INL counter-narcotics aviation programs in Colombia, Peru, Bolivia, Guatemala, Pakistan, Costa Rica, and Afghanistan. About half of the aircraft are operating from Colombia and the rest are in Bolivia, Peru, Pakistan and Afghanistan. Actual operations and support are provided by DynCorp International, as a contractor for the U.S. government.

INL has a broad social media presence with accounts on Twitter, Facebook, Youtube, and Instagram under the handle @stateinl.

See also
Advance-fee fraud
Diplomatic Security Service (DSS) - U.S. Department of State
United States security assistance to the Palestinian National Authority

References

External links
 

INL
Drug policy of the United States
Government agencies established in 1978
1978 establishments in the United States